Alexander James Sawyer (born 13 February 1993) is an English actor, singer, songwriter and director. He is best known for his roles as Alfie Lewis in House of Anubis and Topher in The End of the F***ing World. In 2018, he began portraying David Oumou in Get Shorty.

Early life
Alexander James Sawyer was born in Kent on 13 February 1993, the son of a Ghanaian mother and English-Finnish father. He attended Avenue Primary School in Belmont, Greater London; Aberdour School in Burgh Heath, Surrey; and King's College School in the Wimbledon district of London.

Career
Sawyer began acting at the age of nine when he was in a production of Oliver! as one of the chorus members in a local theatre. He attended classes at Laine Theatre Arts from the age of 11, and in 2010 after appearing in a school production of Joe Penhall's Blue/Orange was scouted by an agent, starting his career as an actor.

He starred as Alfie Lewis on House of Anubis for Nickelodeon which he appeared in up to and inclusive of the third season as well as the TV Movie Special, Touchstone of Ra. Sawyer and the rest of the cast won two Kid's Choice Awards for Favourite Show over the course of the series, in 2011 and 2013.

In late 2013, Sawyer released his debut single "Relapse" featuring Tasie Lawrence.

At the end of 2016, Sawyer was cast in the BBC series Eve as Michael Hoffman. The next year, he appeared in the BBC One's Father Brown as Oscar Bergeres and as Kofi, the novice monk on US network Starz's The White Princess.

Sawyer began 2017 appearing as one of the players in the 50th anniversary revival of Tom Stoppard's Rosencrantz and Guildenstern Are Dead at London's Old Vic Theatre, directed by David Leveaux and featuring Daniel Radcliffe and Joshua McGuire. In summer 2017, he released another single, "Sunlite". A music video was released featuring cameos from actors Louisa Connolly-Burnham and Bobby Lockwood.

In early 2018, Sawyer appeared as Topher in the critically acclaimed Netflix/Channel 4 series The End of the F***ing World. Later that year, he joined the cast of the Epix series Get Shorty for the second season.

Filmography

Television 
{| class="wikitable sortable"
! Year
! Title
! Role
! class="unsortable" | Notes
|-
|2011–2013
|House of Anubis
|Alfie Lewis
|Regular Role
|-
|2011-2013
|Anubis Unlocked
|Himself
|19 episodes
|-
|2013
|House of Anubis: Touchstone of Ra
|Alfie Lewis
|TV special
|-
| rowspan="2" |2016
|Lost in the West
|Jimmy the Kid
|TV mini-seriesEpisode: "Part 1"
|-
|Eve
|Michael Hoffman
|Recurring (season 3)
|-
| rowspan="4" |2017
|Father Brown
|Oscar Bergeres
|Episode: "The Crimson Feather"
|-
|The White Princess
|Kofi, Novice Monk
|TV mini-seriesEpisode: "English Bood on English Soil"
|-
|The End of the F***ing World
|Topher
|2 episodes
|-
|Michael Jackson: Man in the Mirror
|Teenage Michael
|Television film documentary
|-
|2018-2019
|Get Shorty
|David
|8 episodes
|-
|2019
|Harlots
|Jack Lively
|7 episodes|}

Film

Theatre

Discography

Extended plays

Singles

References

External links
 
 

1993 births
Living people
Male actors from Kent
English people of Ghanaian descent
English people of Finnish descent
English male child actors
English male television actors
Black British male actors
People educated at Aberdour School